Begumganj is an upazila of the Noakhali District in Bangladesh's Chittagong Division. Begumganj Thana, now an upazila, was established in 1892.

Geography
It has 118361 households and total area 426.05 km2. It is considered to be a very poorly-drained area of the Old Meghna Estuarine Floodplain along with Laksam Upazila.

History
During the Mughal period, a mosque was established in Chowdhury Bari, Gopalpur which still stands today. On 7 November 1946, Begumganj was visited by Mohandas Gandhi to suppress the Noakhali riots.

Begumganj suffered from tidal bore on 12 November 1970 as part of the 1970 Bhola cyclone. During the Bangladesh Liberation War of 1971, the Noakhali Company led by Subedar Lutfur Rahman was based in Begumganj. Bengali freedom fighters brawled with the Pakistan Army at Aminbazar Point on Chaumuhani-Lakshmipur road on 25 April. The freedom fighters launched an attack on a Razakar Camp located in Chandraganj High School on 2 July. On 19 August, 50 civilians were killed at Nayahat Bazar. Begumganj Thana was finally liberated on 6 August, and monuments were established in Chowmuhani and Sonaipur.

In 1982, Begumganj Thana was upgraded to upazila status as part of the President of Bangladesh Hussain Muhammad Ershad's decentralisation programme. The 1988, 1998 and 2004 floods caused a lot of damage to properties, crops and lives.

Demographics
As of the 2011 Bangladesh census, Begumganj has a population of 549,308. Males constitute 49.2% of the population, and females 50.8%. This Upazila's eighteen up population is 313911. Begumganj has an average literacy rate of 44.4% (7+ years), and the national average of 32.4% literate.

Administration
Begumganj Upazila is divided into Chowmuhani Municipality and 16 union parishads: Alyearpur, Amanullapur, Begumganj, Chayani, Durgapur, Eklashpur, Gopalpur, Hajipur, Jirtali, Kadirpur, Kutubpur, Mirwarishpur, Narottampur, Rajganj, Rasulpur, and Sharifpur. The union parishads are subdivided into 178 mauzas and 184 villages.

Chowmuhani Municipality is subdivided into 9 wards and 23 mahallas.

Education

There are four colleges in the upazila. They include Chowmuhani Government S.A College, Jalal Uddin College, and M. A. Hashem College. Among specialized colleges are Begumgonj Textile Engineering College, Noakhali and Abdul Malek Ukil Medical College, Noakhali.

According to Banglapedia, Begumganj Government Pilot High School, Babupur Jirtoli Union High School, founded in 1928, Ghatla High School (1915), Hazipur Abdul Majid High School (1928), Kadirpur High School (1915), and Kalikapur Babupur Union High School (1929) are notable secondary schools.

The madrasa education system includes eight fazil and one kamil madrasas.

Notable people
Aftab Ahmed, 5th vice-chancellor of the National University, Bangladesh
Moeen U Ahmed, 12th Chief of Army Staff of the Bangladesh Army
Barkat Ullah Bulu, former State Minister for Commerce
Mufazzal Haider Chaudhury, essayist and linguist
MA Hashem, founder of Partex Group
Mamunur Rashid Kiron, director of Globe Pharmaceuticals
Dhiraj Kumar Nath, diplomat
Kazi Golam Rasul, judge known for his verdict in the Assassination of Sheikh Mujibur Rahman case
Chittaranjan Saha, educationist
Mahfuz Ullah, environmentalist

See also
Upazilas of Bangladesh
Districts of Bangladesh
Divisions of Bangladesh

References

Begumganj Upazila